Abduhamit Abdugheni (born 10 March 1998) is a Chinese footballer who plays for Chinese Super League side Chengdu Rongcheng.

Club career
Abduhamit joined China League One club Xinjiang Tianshan Leopard in 2017. He made his senior debut on 8 April 2017, playing the whole match in a 2–1 away loss against Shanghai Shenxin On 16 April 2017, he provided a crucial assist to Wu Peng who scored the winner in his second appearance with a 1–0 home win over Dalian Yifang. He scored his first goalin his third senior match on 23 April 2017, in a 1–0 home win against Dalian Transcendence. Abduhamit scored four goals in 19 appearances for Xinjiang in the 2017 season.

On 7 January 2018, Abduhamit transferred to Chinese Super League side Jiangsu Suning. On 4 March 2018, he made his debut for the club in a 3–1 away victory against Guizhou Hengfeng, coming on as a substitute for Zhang Lingfeng in the 71st minute. He would even be part of the squad that won the 2020 Chinese Super League title. His time at the club would end when the clubs owners were in financial difficulties and dissolved the team.

On 24 March 2021, Abduhamit was free to join top tier club Cangzhou Mighty Lions for the start of the 2021 Chinese Super League season. He would go on to make his debut in a league game on 24 April 2021 against Qingdao in a 2-1 defeat. After one season with the club he would join newly promoted top tier club Chengdu Rongcheng on 26 April 2022. He would go on to make his debut in a league game on 4 June 2022 against Shenzhen in a 2-0 defeat.

Career statistics 
.

Honours

Club
Jiangsu Suning
Chinese Super League: 2020

References

External links
 

1998 births
Living people
Chinese footballers
Uyghur sportspeople
Chinese people of Uyghur descent
People from Ili
Footballers from Xinjiang
Xinjiang Tianshan Leopard F.C. players
Jiangsu F.C. players
Chinese Super League players
China League One players
Association football midfielders